is a Japanese association football club based in Morioka, capital of Iwate Prefecture. They currently play in J3 League, the Japanese third tier of professional football.

Name origin 
"Grulla" is the Spanish word of "crane", which was used in the mon of Nanbu clan of former Morioka han and later became the local symbol of Morioka.

History 

In 2003, a nonprofit organization  was founded, and the team was reorganized and changed their name to Grulla Morioka (グルージャ盛岡) in February 2004 with the intention of achieving elevation to the J. League by 2008.

Under the new organization, former JEF United and Oita Trinita player Shinichi Muto was invited to coach and captain the team with the company of players from the defunct Villanova Morioka and from J2 league. They played their first match on May 9, 2004, and it could be seen as an introduction to the local press beforehand. They won the second division Tohoku Soccer League in 2004 and moved to the first division in 2005. In the same year, they won their first league championship, which was shared with TDK S.C.

In 2013 they won the Regional Promotion Series and were promoted directly to the newly formed J3 League, skipping the Japan Football League which became the new fourth tier.

From the 2019 season, the club has adopted the new name as "Iwate Grulla Morioka". In 2021 they earned promotion to the J2 League as J3 runners-up and will make their debut in the second tier in 2022.

On 28 October 2022, Iwate Grulla Morioka acquired the J1 License, meaning that from the 2022 season, they can now be promoted to the J1 League if the club finishes in J2's Top 2.

It played in the inaugural season of J3 League in 2014 after winning the Tohoku Soccer League, one of the Japanese Regional Leagues, in 2013. Iwate played in the J3 until 2021, when was promoted to the J2 for the 2022 season. After just a season in the second division, the club was relegated back to the J3 with a bottom-league finish of 34 points won in 42 matches.

Stadium 
Iwate plays at (or have played) at three stadiums. Their main stadium is Iwagin Stadium, which has a capacity of 4,938. 

The second stadium is the Kitakami Stadium, located in the city of Kitakami, Iwate, which has a capacity of 6,376. 

They have played before at the Iwate Morioka Stadium.

League & cup record 

Key

Honours
 Tohoku League Div. 2 North Champions 
2004
 Tohoku League Div. 1 Champions 
2005, 2007, 2008, 2009, 2010, 2013

Current squad 
.

Club Staff
For the 2022 season.

Managerial history

Kit evolution

References

External links 
 Grulla Morioka official site 
 GO！GO！GRULLA, a supporting TV program produced by Iwate Menkoi Television 
 グルージャまったり日記, fan site 

 
Association football clubs established in 2003
Football clubs in Japan
Sports teams in Iwate Prefecture
2003 establishments in Japan
J.League clubs
Sport in Morioka